A Gift of Song may refer to:

 Music for UNICEF Concert, subtitled  A Gift of Song, a benefit concert held in the United Nations General Assembly
 A Gift of Song (The Sandpipers album)

See also 
 Gift of Song, a 1970 album by Judith Durham